Kumla Church may refer to one of several churches in Sweden:
Kumla Church in Närke
Kumla Church in Västmanland
Kumla Church in Östergötland